Azdin (or Azedin) Rghioui, was born August 1987 in Nîmes (France) and is a French Karate (Kumite) champion.

In 2007, at the Junior World Championship, he won a silver medal in the junior individual category (under 65 kg).

At the 2012 World Karate Championships, he was part of the winning kumite team.

At the 2013 European Karate Championships, he became European champion.

He has initially influenced by martial art movies, particularly those with Jean-Claude Van Damme and Bruce Lee, before taking up karate with his brothers.

Azedin succeeded in his first selection in 2006 in the Junior Championship in Izmir (Turkey) with an offensive and varied karate .
Trained in Nîmes by Hédi Bouri and Fabrice Fontaine at the Yamato Karate Club.

World conquest: forty years after a first and only visit to Paris, the world karate championship returned to the Paris-Bercy Sports Palace. The French finished first and won the World Male Team Championship beating Turkey in the final. Azdin helped immensely through his decisive victories in the quarter final against Egypt and semi final against Germany.

References

External links
Karate records 

1987 births
Living people
People from Nîmes
French male karateka
Sportspeople from Gard
21st-century French people
20th-century French people